Masters of Reality is the debut album by the band of the same name, Masters of Reality, originally released in January 1989 on Def American. Due to the artwork on the cover, the original release is sometimes referred to as The Blue Garden.

A reissue was released in 1990 on the Delicious Vinyl label. The reissue had a new cover, a change in song sequence and the addition of the song "Doraldina's Prophecies". Delicious Vinyl would reissue the album again in 2012 on deluxe compact disc and vinyl, bundled with the live album How High the Moon: Live at the Viper Room.

The track "The Blue Garden" is sampled on Lemon Jelly's track 88 aka Come Down on Me" on their 2005 album '64–'95.

Track listings

Personnel

Band members
Chris Goss – vocals, guitar
Tim Harrington – lead guitar
Googe – bass
Vinnie Ludovico – drums

Additional musicians
Mr. Owl – additional keyboards

Production
Rick Rubin – producer
Matt Dike, Michael Ross, Chris Goss – additional production on 1990 edition
David Bianco – engineer, mix engineer
Steve Ett – engineer
Brian Jenkins – assistant engineer
John Leamy – cover painting

References

1989 debut albums
Masters of Reality albums
American Recordings (record label) albums
Albums produced by Rick Rubin
Albums recorded at Sound City Studios